Titan Machinery Incorporated is one of the largest American dealers of agricultural and construction equipment. It is based in Fargo, North Dakota and has locations throughout the Midwestern United States. The company is publicly traded on NASDAQ using the symbol TITN. As of 2019, the company reported a Wage ratio of 8:1, compared with a publicly traded average exceeding 200:1.

History
Titan was founded in 1980 and it is headquartered in West Fargo, North Dakota. Titan owns and operates one of the largest networks of full service agricultural and construction equipment stores in North America. These locations represent one or more of the CNHI brands: Case IH, New Holland Agriculture, Case CE, New Holland Construction, and CNH Industrial Capital.

In 2011, it acquired at least four dealership companies in the United States. As of April 1, 2013, Titan had 107 dealerships in Iowa, New Mexico, Arizona, Colorado, Minnesota, Montana, Nebraska, North Dakota, South Dakota, Wisconsin, and Wyoming. In late 2011, Titan announced that they had purchased two Case IH dealers in Bucharest and Timișoara, Romania bring its total to 119 dealerships in the world.

As of February 2022, Titan Machinery operates over 70 dealerships in North American which are located in Colorado, Iowa, Minnesota, Nebraska, North Dakota, South Dakota, Wisconsin and Wyoming as well as 19 European dealerships in Germany, Bulgaria, Romania and Ukraine.

References

External links
Official website

Companies listed on the Nasdaq
Companies based in Fargo–Moorhead
Agriculture companies of the United States
American companies established in 1980
Retail companies established in 1980